Alena Gerber (born 20 August 1989) is a German model, actress and TV host.

Life 
Gerber was born in Baden-Württemberg and was discovered by a German model agency at the age of 13. She participated in regional beauty contests. She also had brief guest appearances on several German TV series and has appeared in a number of German TV shows.

Gerber resides in Switzerland, Germany and the United States. Her agency is Vivienne models.

TV hosting and acting 
After numerous appearances on German IPTV channels she started hosting the Zurich Nightlife show usgang.tv (usgang means "going out"/"clubbing" in Swiss German).

In 2010 Gerber was the face of the Streetparade, the Swiss version of the German Loveparade.

References

External links
 
 Official website
 Alena in an Exclusive Interview with Chris Punnakkattu Daniel

1989 births
Living people
German female models
German television actresses
2000s Playboy Playmates
German television presenters
Actors from Baden-Württemberg
21st-century German actresses
German women television presenters